Gillespie Field  is a public use airport located one nautical mile (2 km) west of the central business district of Meddybemps, a town in Washington County, Maine, United States.

Facilities and aircraft 
It has one runway designated 16/34 with a turf surface measuring 1,635 by 50 feet (498 x 15 m). For the 12-month period ending August 19, 2010, the airport had 700 general aviation aircraft operations, an average of 58 per month.

See also 
 List of airports in Maine

References

External links 
 

Airports in Maine
Airports in Washington County, Maine